This page documents all tornadoes confirmed by various weather forecast offices of the National Weather Service in the United States during January to March 2019. Tornado counts are considered preliminary until final publication in the database of the National Centers for Environmental Information.

United States yearly total

January

January 4 event

January 6 event

January 8 event

January 17 event

January 18 event

January 19 event

January 24 event

January 27 event

February

February 2 event

February 6 event

February 7 event

February 12 event

February 15 event

February 17 event

February 23 event

February 24 event

March

March 1 event

March 2 event

March 3 event

March 9 event

March 12 event

March 13 event

March 14 event

March 22 event

March 24 event

March 29 event

See also
 Tornadoes of 2019
 List of United States tornadoes from November to December 2018
 List of United States tornadoes in April 2019

Notes

References 
	 

2019 natural disasters in the United States
2019-related lists
Tornadoes of 2019
Tornadoes
2019, 1